Jadin Robert Joseph Bell (June 4, 1997 – February 3, 2013) was an American teenager known for his suicide which raised the national profile on youth bullying and the targeted harassment of gay individuals.

Bell, a 15-year-old gay youth, was intensely bullied both in person and on the internet because he was gay. He was a member of the La Grande High School cheerleading team in La Grande, Oregon, where he was a sophomore. On January 19, 2013, Bell went to a local elementary school and hanged himself from the play structure. He did not immediately die from the strangulation and was rushed to the emergency department, where he was kept on life support.

The Associated Press reported that a spokesman for the OHSU Hospital in Portland announced that after being taken off life support, Bell died on February 3, 2013.

Bell's death was widely reported in the media, starting discussions about bullying, the effect it has on youth, and gay bullying. The Huffington Post, Salon, Oregon Public Broadcasting, The Raw Story, GLAAD, PQ Monthly, Pink News  and many other media outlets reported on Bell's death. The media reported his suicide stemmed from being bullied for being gay, which Bell's father fully believed, stating: "He was hurting so bad. Just the bullying at school. Yeah there were other issues, but ultimately it was all due to the bullying, for not being accepted for being gay."

Legacy

After Bell's death, his father, Joe Bell, planned a cross-country tribute in honor of his son. He planned to walk across the entire continental United States within two years, spreading awareness about bullying and the effects that it can have. Bell resigned from his position at Boise Cascade and helped launch Faces for Change, a non-profit anti-bullying foundation, to speak in high schools across the U.S. He stated: "Not doing anything is not acceptable. [Those who watch and do nothing] are just as guilty. They are saying that it is acceptable."

Joe Bell began the walk on April 20, 2013 and was killed halfway through his journey after he was hit by a semi-truck in Colorado on October 9, 2013.  He was pronounced dead at the scene on the shoulder of US 40 when authorities arrived. The driver of the truck, Kenneth Raven, was charged with reckless driving and may have fallen asleep at the wheel. The story was adapted for the 2020 film Joe Bell. Jadin was portrayed by Texan actor Reid Miller.

Faces for Change created a scholarship program in memory of Jadin Bell "to make awards to scholastic institutions on behalf of individuals who have demonstrated a commitment to diversity and the development of community tolerance in our area of service."

See also
 Suicide among LGBT youth
 List of suicides that have been attributed to bullying

References

2013 in LGBT history
2013 in Oregon
Bullying and suicide
Suicides by hanging in Oregon
Deaths by person in Oregon
Gay history
Bullying in the United States
February 2013 events in the United States
LGBT-related suicides
Discrimination against LGBT people in the United States
2013 suicides
Youth suicides